This is a list of newspapers in Nicaragua.

Newspapers

Other Newspapers
El 19 (Managua) (daily, digital)
7 Días (Managua) (bi-weekly)
Confidencial (Managua) (daily, digital)
La Jornada (Managua) (daily, digital)
El Mercurio (Managua) (weekly)
Metro (Managua) (daily)
Notifax (Managua) (newsletter, daily)
El Nuevo Diario (Managua) (daily)
Períodico HOY (Managua) (daily)
La Trinchera de la Noticia (Managua) (newsletter, Monday to Friday)

No longer in circulation 
El Nuevo Diario (Managua)
Barricada (FSLN) (Managua) (out of business)
La Brújula Semanal (Managua) (weekly)
La Crónica (Managua) (out of business)
La Noticia (Managua) (out of business)
Novedades (Managua) (out of business)
El Semanario (Managua) (out of business)
Tiempos del Mundo  (Managua) (out of business)
La Tribuna (Managua) (out of business)

See also
Media of Nicaragua

References

Bibliography

Further reading

External links
 
 

Nicaragua
 
Newspapers

Newspapers